The Henry A. Ware House is a historic house located at 460 Bellefontaine Street in Pasadena, California. Prominent Pasadena architectural firm Greene & Greene designed the American Craftsman style house, which was built in 1913. The house's roof has a complex gabled form typical of Craftsman designs, and its eaves are overhanging with exposed rafters and beams. A large front-facing gable features a stepped brick chimney, while a one-story bay includes Tudor-inspired half-timbering.

The house was added to the National Register of Historic Places on June 15, 2004.

References

Houses on the National Register of Historic Places in California
Houses completed in 1913
Buildings and structures on the National Register of Historic Places in Pasadena, California
Houses in Pasadena, California
American Craftsman architecture in California
1913 establishments in California
Greene and Greene buildings